The McGuinness Institute Te Hononga Waka is a non-partisan think tank based in Wellington, New Zealand, working towards a sustainable future, contributing strategic foresight through evidence-based research and policy analysis. Established in 2004 by Wendy McGuinness, the Institute endeavours to undertake research that is independent, innovative and relevant, in a professional manner. Previously the Sustainable Future Institute, it changed its name in February 2012.

The McGuinness Institute produces publications in the form of research reports, think pieces, newsletters, submissions, working papers, and filmed interviews. As a registered charitable trust, the McGuinness Institute is required to produce annual reports detailing its financial statements.

Project 2058
Started in 2008, Project 2058 has the strategic aim of promoting integrated long-term thinking, leadership and capacity building so that New Zealand can effectively explore and manage risks and opportunities into the year 2058. The project is divided into a series of reports, each covering an important aspect of New Zealand's future. Within Project 2058, the Institute maintains a number of other ongoing projects. These are divided into policy projects and research projects.

Policy projects

Project ForesightNZ
Project ForesightNZ aims to build public policy capability in New Zealand by encouraging long-term, agile thinking around our uncertain future. Initiated in 2008, ForesightNZ is about conceptualising the broad range of possible futures for New Zealand through up-to-date tools and conceptual approaches used in the field of futures studies.
The project is carried out through a number of publications and events. The 2016 ForesightNZ: Untangling New Zealand’s long-term future workshop was a collaboration between the New Zealand Treasury and the McGuinness Institute. The ForesightNZ playing cards were this workshop's primary output. The 2017 WakaNZ: Navigating with foresight workshop was also a collaboration between the McGuinness Institute and the New Zealand Treasury and explored what a preferred future might look like in a post-Treaty of Waitangi settlement New Zealand.

Project ReportingNZ
Project ReportingNZ aims to contribute to a discussion on how to build an informed society. ReportingNZ began in 2016 and formed a major project of the Institute's work programme in 2017 and 2018. The significant pieces of work in this project are the Government Department Strategy (GDS) Index and two surveys and accompanying publications on Extended External Reporting (EER) in collaboration with the External Reporting Board.

Project StrategyNZ
Project StrategyNZ aims to contribute to a discussion on how to improve strategic decision-making, strategy stewardship and implementation in both the private and the public sector. This project has two parts that look at how New Zealand can improve long-term strategic thinking and strategy stewardship. The first is exploring a national sustainable development strategy for New Zealand, which began in 2006 and led to a workshop in March 2011 called StrategyNZ: Mapping our Future. This workshop in turn lead to the formation of the research project TalentNZ based on a quote from speaker Sir Paul Callaghan about creating ‘a place where talent wants to live’. The second aspect of Project StrategyNZ explores strategy stewardship in the New Zealand public sector and involves the GDS Index and the upcoming Project 2058 Report 15: Strengthening Strategy Stewardship in the Public Service.

Research projects

Project CivicsNZ
Project CivicsNZ aims to build the social capital and empowerment of New Zealand citizens. Work in this project has involved building a constitution for the twenty-first century in the EmpowerNZ initiative, with workshops in 2012 and 2013, and more recently involves discussion around civic education. The CivicsNZ project is also linked to the TacklingPovertyNZ project and included a workshop evening in 2017 and publication of a think piece and working paper in 2018.

Project LivestockNZ
Project LivestockNZ aims to explore a new narrative for livestock farming in New Zealand – one that moves towards a more robust and ethically sound way of doing business while at the same time delivering better economic, environmental and social outcomes for all. This project is in its early stages.

Project OneOceanNZ
Project OneOceanNZ aims to explore New Zealand’s public policy landscape in order to contribute to a wider discussion on how we might best manage our oceans. It looks at public policy solutions around ocean governance as an important long-term issue for New Zealand. The Institute has made a number of submissions as part of this project and also facilitated the formation of the New Zealand Antarctic Youth Council.

Project PublicScienceNZ
Project PublicScienceNZ aims to contribute to a discussion on government-funded science in the hope that New Zealand invests its research dollar well and delivers sustainable outcomes for current and future generations. The project was established in 2012 and is ongoing. PublicScienceNZ also brings together the Institute's previous work on genetic modification policy and regulations, and pandemic management.

Project TacklingPovertyNZ
Project TacklingPovertyNZ aims to contribute to a national conversation on how to reduce poverty in New Zealand. This project began in 2015 with a workshop in December at the New Zealand Treasury. Since then, the Institute has held six more workshops throughout New Zealand, with the goal of gathering local perspectives on poverty. From this tour, the Institute sent a proposal to Prime Minister Bill English at the end of 2016 concerning the creation of demarcated zones for public policy innovation in three of the areas visited on the workshop tour. The proposal garnered some coverage in the New Zealand media.

Project TalentNZ
Project TalentNZ aims to contribute to Sir Paul Callaghan’s vision of making New Zealand ‘a place where talent wants to live’. Project TalentNZ began in 2011 at a StrategyNZ workshop with Sir Paul Callaghan’s keynote speech. Since then, the Institute has published the TalentNZ Journal and developed a Menu of Initiatives, which illustrates New Zealand’s talent ecosystem and lays out action points for growing, attracting, retaining and connecting talented individuals.

Project Nation Dates
In 2011 the Institute published Nation Dates, a book that presents a timeline of significant events that have shaped New Zealand as a nation. The second edition was published in 2012 and the third edition was published in 2017.

Workshops
One of the McGuinness Institute's core values is to provide platforms and opportunities for New Zealanders, with a particular focus on amplifying the voices of young people aged between 18 and 25. McGuinness Institute workshops are the primary tool for achieving this. The workshops focus on public policy issues that are strategic, complex, and long-term in nature.

James Duncan Reference Library
The James Duncan Reference Library is located at the office of McGuinness Institute in Wellington. Named after the former Chair of the Commission for the Future, Professor James Duncan (1921–2001), the library was established to provide a record of long-term thinking in New Zealand. The library and archive house over 4710 books and publications on New Zealand’s future-thinking initiatives and historical development, the theory and practice of future-thinking, strategy development, and national and international perspectives.

References

Think tanks based in New Zealand
Charities based in New Zealand
2004 establishments in New Zealand